Famous, Rich and Beautiful is the second album by Canadian R&B band The Philosopher Kings, released in 1997.

The band's most successful album, Famous, Rich and Beautiful earned the group several Juno Award nominations: for Best R&B/Soul Recording of the Year in 1998, and for Pop Album of the Year and Single of the Year (for "Hurts to Love You") in 1999. The songs "I Am the Man", "You Don't Love Me (Like You Used to Do)" and "Cry", a cover of the Godley & Creme song, were also notable hit singles from the album. The album peaked at #62 on the RPM Canadian Albums Chart. In 1998, the album was certified Platinum in Canada.

Track listing
 "Hurts to Love You" (5:21)
 "I Am the Man" (4:24)
 "You Stepped on My Life" (4:21)
 "You Don't Love Me (Like You Used to Do)" (4:23)
 "Little Rosie" (4:34)
 "Oleo" (6:06)
 "End" (2:50)
 "Super Sugar Supreme" (3:33)
 "Head First" (3:38)
 "New Messiah" (4:07)
 "You're Allowed" (3:43)
 "Cry" (3:04)
 "Wide Awake" (4:56)
 "Dinah" (2:07)

References

The Philosopher Kings albums
1997 albums
Columbia Records albums